KRT76 is a keratin gene. Loss of this gene's expression or downregulation of the gene is associated with oral cancer.

References